Dame Katharine Mary Barker  (born 1957) is a British economist. She is principally noted for her role at the Bank of England and for advising the British government on social issues such as housing and health care.

Early career 
Barker grew up in Stoke-on-Trent. She received a degree in Philosophy, Politics and Economics at St Hilda's College, Oxford in 1979 and then worked for a large pension fund in London.  She was a research officer at the National Institute of Economic and Social Research (1981–85) and was the chief European economist at the Ford Motor Company in Brentwood (1985–94). From 1994 to 2001, she was chief economic adviser at the Confederation of British Industry (CBI). She was also a member of the HM Treasury's Panel of Independent Economic Advisers 1996–97; and a non-executive director of the Yorkshire Building Society (1999-April 2001).

Barker was appointed as an external member of the Monetary Policy Committee of the Bank of England with effect from  1 June 2001. The MPC is responsible for setting interest rates to meet the Government's inflation target. She is the only external MPC member to have been appointed for three terms, the latest of which ended on 31 May 2010. She was not eligible for a fourth term.

Housing, social care and other policy work 
Barker was appointed by the Government in April 2003 to conduct an independent Review of UK Housing Supply; leading to a final report in March 2004. The Government's full response to this review was published in December 2005. In October 2005, she was appointed a board member of the Housing Corporation, and from 2008 to 2011 of one of its successor bodies, the Homes and Communities Agency. 

In December 2005, she was asked to conduct an independent Review of Land Use Planning, and she reported on 5 December 2006. From 2010 to May 2015, she was chair of the Northern Ireland Economic Advisory Group. She was appointed as one of two non-executive members of the UK government's Office for Budget Responsibility from June 2011 to June 2017.

Barker was appointed Commander of the Order of the British Empire (CBE) for services to social housing in 2006 and Dame Commander of the Order of the British Empire (DBE) in the 2014 Birthday Honours for services to the economy. She is an Academician of the Academy of Social Sciences.

Her book, Housing: Where's the Plan was published in September 2014 by London Publishing Partnership, in their Perspectives series.

In 2014 she chaired a commission on the Future of Health and Social Care in England for the King's Fund, which delivered its final report in September. She also led a quality review of the National Accounts for the Office for National Statistics during 2014.

Board memberships and other posts 

Barker was a non-executive director on the board of the Yorkshire Building Society from 2010 to 2017. She was a senior adviser to Credit Suisse, 2010–2016.

From 2010 to June 2016, she was a non-executive director of Electra Private Equity plc, and interim chairman from November 2015.

In March 2014, she was appointed a member of the Fiscal Policy Panel of the States of Jersey, and became chairman of the Panel in April 2016.

Barker became chair of the advisory board for the Centre for Business Research at the Judge Business School, University of Cambridge, in October 2012. She was a governor at Anglia Ruskin University from 2000 to 2010, and chair of governors 2007–2010; in October 2011, the university awarded her an honorary doctorate.

She was chair of the Society of Business Economists from 2013 to 2016. She has been a trustee of the Essex Community Foundation.

In September 2014, Barker became chairman of the trustees of the British Coal Staff Superannuation Scheme.

She was a non-executive director (NED) of Taylor Wimpey plc from April 2011 to July 2020, and joined the board of Man Group plc in April 2017.

From April 2017 to March 2020, she was a member of the National Infrastructure Commission. From July 2017 to April 2020 she was a member of the council, Oxford University.

In July 2019, she joined the UK Cabinet Office's Geospatial Commission as one of four new commissioners.

In April 2020 Barker became a trustee of the Universities Superannuation Scheme (USS), and takes over as chairman from Professor Sir David Eastwood in September 2020.

Previously an independent member of the Football Regulatory Authority of the Football Association, she is a Stoke City F.C. fan.

References 

1957 births
Living people
Alumni of St Hilda's College, Oxford
British economists
Date of birth missing (living people)
Dames Commander of the Order of the British Empire
Fellows of the Academy of Social Sciences
Monetary Policy Committee members
People from Stoke-on-Trent
British women economists